Thaddeus Vladimir Gromada (born 30 July 1929 in Passaic, New Jersey) is a Polish-American historian. He is a professor emeritus of European history at the New Jersey City University, a former executive director and president of the Polish Institute of Arts & Sciences of America (PIASA) and the Polish American Historical Association and a trustee and vice chair of The Kosciuszko Foundation. His scholarly interests are focused on areas such as Polish and Polish-American 20th-century history.

Gromada received a B.S. from Seton Hall University in 1951, before then studying at Fordham University, where he received both the M.A. (1953) and Ph.D. (1966). At Fordham, he studied under Oskar Halecki. His doctoral dissertation, "The Slovak Question in Polish Foreign Policy, 1934-1939," was supervised by Oscar Halecki till 1964 only two years before he received his Ph.D.in1966, Halecki retired after the death of his wife. Dr. Gecys was a pro forma supervisor for the last two years.  ProQuest Dissertations & Theses Global database.</ref>
 
He began teaching at what was then known as Jersey City State College in 1959, being promoted to associate professor in 1966, and to professor in 1969.

References

External links
Thaddeus Gromada's homepage
Fonds No. 67: Thaddeus Gromada Papers at PIASA

Living people
1929 births
American people of Polish descent
Historians of Poland
New Jersey City University faculty
People from Passaic, New Jersey
Fordham University alumni
Recipients of the Order of Polonia Restituta
Historians from New Jersey